Sierra Pacific Industries is the second-largest lumber producer in the United States. Located in Anderson, California, it manages almost 1.9 million acres of timberland. It is the largest private landholder in California.

References

Companies based in Shasta County, California
Forest products companies of the United States
Privately held companies based in California